Mark Aronoff, a native of Montreal, Quebec, is a morphologist and distinguished professor at Stony Brook University.  The editor of Language from 1995 to 2001 and president of the Linguistic Society of America in 2005, he has been elected a fellow of both the American Association for the Advancement of Science and the American Academy of Arts and Sciences.

Education and academic career
Born and raised in Québec, Canada, Aronoff graduated from McGill University in 1969 with a B.A. in Linguistics, completing his Ph.D. in Linguistics at M.I.T. in 1974.

Upon completing his Ph.D., Aronoff took a position as an Assistant Professor of Linguistics at the State University of New York at Stony Brook, which he has called “the only real job I have had in my life.” Promoted to Full Professor a few years later, Aronoff served as Chair of the Department of Linguistics from 1980 to 1993.

In addition to his scholarly output and teaching, Aronoff has a strong commitment to professional service, within both his university and his field. From 1998 to 2010, he served in the administration of the State University of New York as Associate Provost for Undergraduate Education. This overlapped with his tenure, from 1995 to 2001, as editor of Language (the journal of the Linguistic Society of America), as well as his term as president of the LSA in 2005.

Books (selected)

Personal life 

Aronoff is married to Donna Di Donato, a former assistant provost for undergraduate academic affairs at Stony Brook. He has three children from his previous marriage.

References

External links
Mark Aronoff's Stony Brook Homepage
Word-Structure, Aronoff's doctoral thesis
Morphology: an interview with Mark Aronoff. ReVEL, vol. 7, n. 12, 2009.

Linguists from the United States
Morphologists
MIT School of Humanities, Arts, and Social Sciences alumni
Living people
Stony Brook University faculty
1949 births
Fellows of the American Association for the Advancement of Science
Fellows of the American Academy of Arts and Sciences
Linguistic Society of America presidents
Fellows of the Linguistic Society of America